Andrey Andreyevich Smirnov, (15 October 1905 in Moscow – 26 February 1982), was a Soviet career diplomat.

Early life 
Smirnov graduated from the Leningrad Institute of Planning in 1934, and joined the People's Commissariat of Foreign Affairs in 1936. From 1940 until diplomatic relations were broken off with Nazi Germany on 22 June 1941, he was an adviser at the Embassy of the USSR in Germany.

Diplomatic career 
He was appointed as Ambassador of the Soviet Union to Iran on 28 June 1941, awarded the diplomatic rank of Ambassador Extraordinary and Plenipotentiary on 14 June 1943, and served in Tehran until 1 September 1943.

At the conclusion of his mission to Iran, he returned to Moscow and worked in the European Department of the Ministry of Foreign Affairs, and was promoted to Deputy Minister of Foreign Affairs in 1946, and held this position under 1949. On 31 March 1956, he began his mission as Ambassador of the Soviet Union to Austria, serving in Vienna only until 14 October 1956.

He began his mission as Ambassador of the Soviet Union to West Germany on 14 October 1956, and held the post for 10 years, until 19 May 1966. At the expiration of his mission to Bonn, he was appointed as Ambassador of the Soviet Union to Turkey on 19 May 1966, and served in the Turkish capital Ankara until 6 January 1969.

At the conclusion of his mission to Turkey, he returned to Moscow as the Deputy Minister of Foreign Affairs, and also served as Chairman of the USSR Commission for UNESCO from 19701973.

References 

1905 births
1982 deaths
Diplomats from Moscow
People from Moskovsky Uyezd
Communist Party of the Soviet Union members
Ambassador Extraordinary and Plenipotentiary (Soviet Union)
Ambassadors of the Soviet Union to Austria
Ambassadors of the Soviet Union to Turkey
Ambassadors of the Soviet Union to West Germany
Ambassadors of the Soviet Union to Iran
Permanent Delegates of the Soviet Union to UNESCO
Recipients of the Order of the Red Banner of Labour